A total of 12 CONCACAF teams entered the competition. The 10 teams were divided into 5 groups of 2 in which one of them will advance to the final tournament.

Preliminary round
Series One

20 April 1969, Port-au-Prince, Haiti –  2 - 0 

11 May 1969, San Diego, United States –  0 - 1 

Haiti qualifies with aggregate score of 3-0.

Series Two

21 October 1969, Mexico City, Mexico –  3 - 0 

2 November 1969, Hamilton, Bermuda –  2 - 1 

Mexico qualifies with aggregate score of 4-2.

Series Three

11 April 1969, Kingston, Jamaica –  1 - 1 

11 May 1969, Kingston, Jamaica –  1 - 2 

Jamaica qualifies with aggregate score of 3-2.

Series Four

 was disqualified due to Football War with El Salvador, so  advanced to the tournament automatically.

Series Five

 was disqualified due to Football War with Honduras, so '' advanced to the tournament automatically.

References

CONCACAF Gold Cup qualification
qualification